Jeannine Haffner is a singer and songwriter who is credited with writing the song Yes We Can, which is a folk rock song inspired by Barack Obama's speech following his win in the North Carolina primary on May 6, 2008.

The lyrics to this version of ‘Yes We Can’ are a rallying cry to all people to come together for the good of the country and the world. These lyrics can be found at www.thejsband.com (4). Oak Park newspaper, The Wednesday Journal (5), said,"she has written a political song, something in the style of a modern day Joan Baez…". The song is a departure from already existing songs of the same name.

Since its release on YouTube, the video has been slowly making its way around the world on the internet on AOLVideo(6), Facebook(7), My Space(8), and is currently being watched locally on the Chicago Tribune website ‘Chicago Live’ (9) and Fox News website ‘UReport’ (10). Miss Haffner recently released a follow-up video of the same song ‘Yes We Can’ (tube top version) on YouTube to get the song more attention. She is keeping her fans updated on the song's progress at her blog called ‘Obama Blonde’ at www.mybarackobama.com. (11)

Yes We Can
Single video by The J's featuring Jeannine Haffner
Release Date: May 26, 2008
Format: Streaming Video
Recorded: Oak Park, Il May 26, 2008
Genre: folk, rock
Length: 2:58
Writer: Jeannine Haffner
Producer: Jeannine Haffner

Yes We Can (tube top version)
Single video by Jeannine Haffner featuring Jeannine Haffner
Release Date: June 23, 2008
Format: Streaming Video
Recorded: Oak Park, Il May 26, 2008
Genre: folk, rock
Length: 2:16
Writer: Jeannine Haffner
Producer: Jeannine Haffner

Other music by Jeannine Haffner
CD  Late Bloomer  available CDBaby.com
Singles available at iTunes, CDconnection, aol.com, greatindie.com,                  bitmunk.com, amazon.com, payplay.fm

 The song and video were released on YouTube on May 26, 2008, by Haffner's band, The J's, featuring Jeannine Haffner on guitar and vocals.

References

External links
Obama Blonde

Year of birth missing (living people)
Living people